Soundings is a triannual academic journal of leftist political thinking, which was established in 1995 and is published by Lawrence and Wishart. The current convening editor is Sally Davison. The current editorial collective is: Sally Davison, David Featherstone, Kirsten Forkert, Deborah Grayson,  Hannah Hamad, Ben Little, Jo Littler, Marina Prentoulis, Michael Rustin, Alison Winch.

History 
Its founding editors-in-chief were Stuart Hall (Open University), Doreen Massey (Open University), and Michael Rustin (University of East London). Jonathan Rutherford was editor from 2004 to 2012.

Since 2008 Soundings has published a series of online books.

References

External links 

Political science journals
Publications established in 1995
English-language journals
Triannual journals